Heathland is a townland in County Westmeath, Ireland.

Heathland is one of 10 townlands of the civil parish of Lackan in the barony of Corkaree in the Province of Leinster.

The neighbouring townlands are: Rathganny to the north, Ballindurrow and Culleendarragh to the east, Ballynafid and Kilpatrick to the south and Fulmort and Leny to the west. 

In the 1911 census of Ireland there were 7 houses and 88 inhabitants in the townland. This includes Wilson's Hospital School.

References

External links
Heathland at the IreAtlas Townland Data Base
Heathland at Townlands.ie
  Heathland at Logainm.ie

Townlands of County Westmeath